John Norton Bartlett (26 June 1928 – 8 June 2014) was an English cricketer, born in Mickleover, Derbyshire, who played for Oxford University and Sussex between 1946 and 1953. He appeared in 49 first-class matches as a righthanded batsman who bowled left-arm orthodox spin. He scored 351 runs with a highest score of 28 and took 107 wickets with a best performance of five for 77. His death was announced in June 2014.

Notes

1928 births
2014 deaths
English cricketers
Sussex cricketers
Oxford University cricketers
Marylebone Cricket Club cricketers
Gentlemen cricketers
Combined Services cricketers
Free Foresters cricketers
Alumni of Lincoln College, Oxford
People from Mickleover
Cricketers from Derby